The following is a list of the IRMA's number-one singles of 2004.

See also
2004 in music
List of artists who reached number one in Ireland

2004 in Irish music
Ireland singles
2004